The following squads and players competed in the European Women's Handball Championship in 2006 in Sweden.

Austria 

Natalia Rusnachenko
Gabriela Rotis-Nagy
Katrin Engel
Sorina Teodorovic
Simona Spiridon
Tanja Logvin
 Marina Budecevic
 Corinna Flandorfer
Stefanie Ofenböck
Petra Blazek
 Laura Magelinskas
Isabell Plach
 Monika Richter
 Sabrina Thurner
 Nina Stumvoll
Elisabeth Herbst

Croatia 

 Ivana Jelcic
 Maida Arslanagic
 Svitlana Pasicnik
 Maja Zebic
 Bozica Palcic
 Anita Gace
 Ivanka Hrgovic
 Maja Koznjak
 Nikica Pusic
 Jelena Grubisic
 Lidija Horvat
 Ivana Lovric
 Vesna Milanovic Litre
 Andrea Penezic
 Dijana Batelka
 Ana Krizanac
Nina Jukopila

Denmark 

 Katrine Fruelund
 Henriette Rönde Mikkelsen
 Lene Thomsen
 Kristina Bille-Hansen
 Anette Bonde Christensen
 Kamilla Kristensen
 Lene Lund Nielsen
 Rikke Skov
 Malene Dalgaard
 Louise Bager Due
 Karin Mortensen
 Louise Mortensen
 Rikke Nielsen
 Rikke Schmidt
 Mette Sjöberg
 Trine Troelsen
 Louise Svalastog

France 

 Isabelle Wendling
 Stephanie Cano
 Paule Baudouin
 Siraba Dembele
 Nina Kamto Njitam
 Angelique Spincer
 Christiane Vanparys Torres
 Maakan Tounkara
 Sophie Herbrecht
 Ludivine Jacquinot
 Alexandra Lacrabere
 Stephanie Lambert
 Valerie Nicolas
 Veronique Pecqueux-Rolland
 Linda Pradel
 Raphaelle Tervel
 Katty Piejos

Germany 

Nadine Krause
Maren Baumbach
Grit Jurack
Stefanie Melbeck
Anja Althaus
Nadine Härdter
Anne Müller
Nora Reiche
Angie Geschke
 Alexandra Gräfer
Anna Loerper
Sabrina Neukamp
Nina Wörz
Clara Woltering
 Silke Meier
Sabine Englert

Hungary 

 Ibolya Mehlmann
 Mónika Kovacsicz
 Erika Kirsner
 Bernadett Ferling
 Piroska Szamoránsky
 Gabriella Szűcs
 Anita Görbicz
 Ágnes Hornyák
 Eszter Siti
 Tímea Tóth
 Orsolya Vérten
 Zsanett Borbély
 Orsolya Herr
 Katalin Pálinger
 Beatrix Balogh
 Rita Borbás

Macedonia 

 Alegra Vernalise Oholanga Loki
 Marina Naukovich
 Valentina Radulovic
 Natasa Kocevska
 Biljana Crvenkoska
 Dragana Pecevska
 Tanja Andrejeva
 Andrijana Atanasovska
 Klara Boeva
 Elena Gjeorgjievska
 Olga Kolesnik
 Natasha Mladenovska
 Anzela Platon Dimovska
 Julija Portjanko
 Lenche Ilkova
 Veselinka Zasovska

Netherlands 

 Diane Lamein
 Saskia Mulder
 Joyce Hilster
 Irina Pusic
 Maura Visser
 Arjenne Paap
 Miranda Robben
 Evelien van der Koelen
 Pearl van der Wissel
 Andrea Groot
 Silvia Hofman
 Willemijn Karsten
 Debbie Klijn
 Joke Nynke Tienstra

Norway 

 Gro Hammerseng
 Kari Mette Johansen
 Ragnhild Aamodt
 Marit Malm Frafjord
 Kristine Lunde
 Tonje Nöstvold
 Anette Hovind Johansen
 Else Marthe Sörlie Lybekk
 Karoline Dyhre Breivang
 Katja Nyberg
 Linn Kristina Riegelhuth
 Kari Aalvik Grimsbö
 Katrine Lunde
 Göril Snorroeggen
 Terese Pedersen
 Anne Kjersti Suvdal
Marianne Rokne

Poland 

 Sabina Kubisztal
Kinga Polenz
 Aleksandra Jacek
 Dagmara Kowalska
 Malgorzata Majerek
 Agata Wypych
 Ewa Damiecka
 Izabela Duda
 Dorota Malczewska
Karolina Siodmiak
 Kaja Zaleczna
Karolina Kudlacz
 Iwona Lacz
Agnieszka Jochymek
 Magdalena Chemicz

Russia 

 Liudmila Bodnieva
 Zhanna Yakovleva
 Anna Kareeva
 Elena Polenova
 Irina Poltoratskaya
 Ekaterina Andryushina
 Irina Bliznova
 Liudmila Postnova
 Ekaterina Marennikova
 Oxana Romenskaya
 Natalia Shipilova
 Maria Sidorova
 Inna Suslina
 Emiliya Turey
Polina Vyahiryeva
Olga Levina

Serbia 

 Marina Rokic
 Marina Dmitrovic
 Jovana Bartosic
 Jelena Eric
 Ivana Mladenovic
 Tatjana Medved
 Slavica Koperec
 Sanja Damnjanovic
 Sladjana Djeric
 Sladjana Grozdanic
 Branka Jovanovic
 Andrea Lekic
 Nada Micic
 Ana Vojcic
 Ivana Filipovic
 Katarina Vojcic

Slovenia 

 Sergeja Stefanisin
 Anja Freser
 Tatjana Oder
 Mojca Dercar
 Vesna Pus
 Mihaela Ciora
 Manuela Hrnjic
 Kristina Mihic
 Tina Sotler
 Anja Argenti
 Nataliya Derepasko
 Silvana Ilic
 Katja Kurent Tatarovac
 Misa Marincek
 Katja Cerenjak

Spain 

 Aitziber Elejaga Vargas
Marta Mangue Gonzales
Macarena Aguilar Diaz
Susana Fraile Celaya
 Christina Lopez Quiros
Noelia Oncina Morena
Isabel Ortuno Torrico
 Yolanda Sanroman Elexpuru
Diana Box Alonso
 Sara Castro Ramirez
 Begona Fernandez Molinos
Cristina Gonzalez Ramos
 Beatriz Morales Tendero
Patricia Pinedo Saenz
Silvia Navarro Gimenez
Eider Rubio Ponce

Sweden 

Jessica Enström
Linnea Torstensson
 Terese Krantz
Tina Flognman
Annika Wiel Freden
Matilda Boson
 Asa Könsberg
 Therese Brorsson
 Katarina Chrifi
Sara Eriksson
Madeleine Grundström
Sara Holmgren
 Fanny Lagerström
Johanna Wiberg
 Helena Andersson
Therese Helgesson
Petra Skogsberg

Ukraine 

 Olena Tsyhytsia
 Oksana Sakada
 Natalya Lyapina
 Olena Radchenko
 Oksana Raykhel
 Olena Reznir
 Irina Sheyenko
 Regina Shymkute
 Marina Verhelyuk-Stri
 Marija Boklashchuk
 Maria Makarenko
 Irina Shybanova
 Viktoria Tymoshenkova
 Olena Yatsenko
 Olga Layuk

References 

European Handball Championship squads